Custer County District High School is a public high school located in Miles City, Montana, United States. It is a part of Custer County School District.

History
The "Miles City High School" graduated its first student in 1893. In 1903, the school added the twelfth grade and changed its name to "Custer County High School", which had its first graduates in 1904. The first high school was at the location of the current Washington Middle School, but then was a multi-story building located in the northeastern part of the town, next to the Ursuline Convent of the Sacred Heart. In 1922, a new building was constructed at the current location on South Center Avenue. Additions were made in the early-1960s. The new buildings contained additional classrooms and a gymnasium, and were connected to the older building with an enclosed ramp.

The name was changed to "Custer County District High School" as a result of combining the school boards for the elementary and the high school in the late 1960s.

Notable alumni
Kurt Alme, attorney and government official
Maurice Hilleman, microbiologist who developed over 36 vaccines, saving millions of lives; class of 1938
Elmer Holt, governor of Montana (1935–37), class of 1899
James Ulio, adjutant general of the U.S. Army (1942–46), class of 1899
George Winston, pianist
Caleb Frare, baseball player, Chicago White Sox

References

External links
School's website
Reunion site

Public high schools in Montana
Buildings and structures in Miles City, Montana
Education in Custer County, Montana
Educational institutions established in 1893